Palazhi is a suburb of Kozhikode city in India.  It has risen to prominence quite recently because of the UL cyberpark, the Government Cyber park and the creation of a township called HiLITE City and Landmark world and many other flat projectshere.  Palazhi town is four kilometres from Thondayad junction in Kozhikode city.  Metro International Cardiac Center and the Cradle Maternity hospital are situated at Palazhi.

History
100 years ago, the beach area was the centre of the city of Kozhikode. In the 1970s, the downtown shifted to the Mananchira area, and in the 1980s, Mavoor Road became the centre of activity. In the 2010s, the Thondayad Bypass area and the suburb of Palazhi on the Airport road have emerged as the new city centres with a vibrant night life.

Palazhi was originally a village with waterlogged streets in monsoon creating problems for the residents.  Recently the area has been highly commercialized because of the proximity to the highway road and the eastern part of the city.  The creation of Hilite Township and Hilite Mall has increased traffic issues in and around Palazhi.

Methottuthazham
Methottuthazham is a small village on the western side of Palazhi.  This place is famous for the Bhayankavu Temple and the Ollur Shiva Temple.  City suburbs like Vazhipokku, Manathal Thazham, Poovangal, Mecheri Thazham, Kaithapadam, Kattukulangara and Kommeri are near to Methott Thazham.  Methott Thazham is directly connected by a main road to Kottooli and Pottammal junctions.

Flooded Streets
Every year, the streets of Palazhi area gets flooded from June to August.  During this period, access to the houses in this area becomes very difficult either by foot or by vehicles.  As the flooded area is quite large, no solutions have been devised yet for this issue.

Hilite Township
Hilite township is a residential and commercial facility located at Palazhi junction.  Hilite Mall is the largest shopping mall of North Kerala with 1,400,000 sq feet of shopping space.  It is part of the Hilite City (11.256873°N 75.821287°E), an integrated township project almost completed now. The  actor Nirmal Palazhi is from this place.

Landmarks in Palazhi
 Cyberpark Kozhikode
 Uralungal Cyberpark
 Metro International Cardiac Center
 Cradle Maternity Hospital
 Landmark World
 HiLite City
 Palazhi Timber
 Koodathum Para Colony
 Mampuzha Bridge
 Nesto Hypermarket
 Dominos pizza

Location

See also
 Airport Road, Kozhikode

References

External links
PVS Prestige Palazhi

Suburbs of Kozhikode
Kozhikode downtown